Kalippattam (English: Toy) is a 1993 Malayalam film written and directed by Venu Nagavalli and starring Mohanlal, Urvashi, Thilakan, Kaviyoor Ponnamma, Jagathy and Nedumudi Venu. Mohanlal also sang a song ("Vazhiyoram") with Chithra for the film. The story is about the love between a violinist played by Mohanlal and a terminally ill girl played by Urvashi. The music and background score were composed by Raveendran.

Plot 
In the first scene, we are shown an old man named Venu who came with flowers to strew his lady's grave. The story is narrated through his memories. Venu was an educated young man who worked for a wealthy businessman Menon at his tea plantation. After being fired, he tried to get his job back by playing music for Menon's only daughter, Sarojam

Sarojam eventually falls in love with Venu and expresses her wish to marry him.  Wanting to keep her unawares about her fatal condition, aplastic anaemia, Menon was ready to do anything for her. Menon tells Venu about the illness and asks him whether he was ready for the marriage. Menon offers him all the wealth and the complete authority of his family business. Venu, whose family is in a dire state, accepts the offer and marries Sarojam. Initially, he pretended to love her as he felt sympathetic for her and wanted to make her happy always. However, gradually he falls in true love with her and an inseparable relation blossoms between them. Sarojam gives birth to a daughter, Ammu.

When Ammu is a few years old, Sarojam develops severe symptoms of the disease. Dr. Menon suggests that bone marrow transplant may lead to a recovery in her. After the bone marrow transplant, Sarojam seem to recover but soon her condition worsens and she dies in the hands of Venu. Then we are shown the first scene, which was Venu standing aside Sarojam's grave. After a while, Unni, a close friend of Venu comes there to inform him that his daughter Ammu is also affected with the same disease. Venu is shocked but he was not allowed to cry even as Ammu should never know about this. The heartbroken Venu returns to his bungalow with Ammu. There he has a strange visitor named Hari, an unemployed young man, who comes there with a recommendation letter for a job. Soon, Venu realizes that, what has happened in his and Sarojam's life is getting repeated in his daughter's life too, through Hari. He allows Hari to stay there and in the last scene, Venu calls Hari to his room, in the same way as he was called by Menon for Sarojam's proposal.

Cast

Soundtrack
The song lyrics were penned by Konniyoor Bhaas with Raveendran composing tunes for the same.

 "Mozhiyazhakum" - K J Yesudas, K S Chithra
 "Konchi,Konchi" - M G Sreekumar
 "Vazhiyoram" - Mohanlal, K S Chithra
 "Kalipattamayi" - K J Yesudas

References

External links
 
 Kalippattam at the Malayalam Movie Database

1993 films
1990s Malayalam-language films
Films directed by Venu Nagavally
Films scored by Raveendran